Belorussia-class cargo ships were a Soviet Union class of 25 cargo ships which were built on the West Coast of the United States as per design 1013 and as per Lend-Lease Agreement purchased by USSR in 1942–1945 years, during World War II, as the USSR needed ships of the merchant fleet during World War II and in the first years after this war. Sometimes this class of the ships in USSR marked as West-class cargo ships due to all ships were built on the West Coast of US.

List of Belorussia-class cargo ships, design 1013

Notes

References

See also

 Design 1013 ship

Ships of Far East Shipping Company
Ships of Black Sea Shipping Company
Merchant ships of the Soviet Union
Merchant ships of the United States
World War II merchant ships of the Soviet Union
Design 1013 ships
Ships built in Portland, Oregon
Steamships of the United States
Soviet Union–United States relations